This is a list of abbots and grand priors of the Basilica of Saint-Denis.

This list is drawn mostly from Félicie d'Ayzac, Histoire de Saint-Denys (Paris, 1861), Vol. 1, pp. cxxiii–cxxxi.

Abbots
For the first part of this list, dates may indicate attestations and not dates of reign.

 Dodo: 627
 Chunuald: 632
 Aigulf: before 639
 Wandebercht: 647
 Charderic: 678×690
 Chaino: 690–696
 Dalphinus: 709/710
 Chillardus: 710–716
 Turnoald: 717
 Hugh I: 718–730
 Berthoald: 723
 Godobald: 726
 Amalbert: 749
 Fulrad: 750–784
 Maginarius: 789–793
 Fardulf: 793–806
 Waldo of Reichenau: 806–814
 Hilduin († 841): 814–841
 Louis: 841–867
 Charles the Bald: 867–877 (in commendam)
 Gozlin I: 877–886
 Ebles: 886–903 (in commendam)
 Robert I: 903–923 (in commendam)
 Hugh II: 923–956 (in commendam)
 Hugh III: 956–??? (in commendam)
 Gozlin II
 Gerard
 Robert II: 980
 Odilo: 994
 Vivian: 998
 Hugh IV: 1049–1062
 Raynier: 1067
 William I: 1071
 Yves I: 1091

For the remainder of the list dates are regnal dates.

 Adam: 1094/1099–1122
 Suger: 1122–1151
 Odo II of Deuil: 1151–1162
 Odo III of Taverny: 1162–1169
 Yves II: 1169–1173
 William II of Gap: 1173–1180, dismissed by the king
 Hugh V Foucaut: 1186–1197
 Hugh VI of Milan: 1197–1204
 Henry I Troon: 1204–1221
 Pierre d'Auteuil: 1221–1229
 Odo IV: 1228–1245
 William III: 1246–1253
 Henry II Mallet: 1254–1258, resigned
 Matthew of Vendôme: 1258–1286
Renaud de Giffard: 1286–1304
Gilles I de Pontoise: 1304–1325
Guy I de Châtres: 1326–1343, resigned
Gilles II Rigaud: 1343–1351
Gauthier II de Pontoise: 1351–1354
Robert III de Fontenay: 1354–1363
Guy de Monceau: 1363–1393
Philippe I de Vilette: 1393–1418
Jean I de Borbon: 1418–1431
Guillaume IV Farréchal: 1431–1442
Philippe II de Gamaches: 1442–1464
Jean II Jouffroy: 1464–1474
Jean III de Villiers: 1474–1499
Antoine de la Haye: 1499–1505
Pierre II de Gouffier: 1505–1517
Aymar Gouffier de Boisy: 1517–1519
Jean d'Orimont: 1519–1529
Louis II de Bourbon-Vendôme: 1529–1557 (in commendam)
Charles, Cardinal of Lorraine: 1557–1574
Louis III de Lorraine: 1574–1589
Charles III: 1589–1594
Louis IV de Lorraine: 1594–1622
Henri III de Lorraine: 1622–1642
Armand de Bourbon-Conti: 1642–1654
Jules Cardinal Mazarin: 1654-1661
Jean-François Paul de Gondi: 1662-1679

Grand priors 
In 1691, Louis XIV suppressed the title of abbot and subsequent superiors bear the title of grand prior. Its revenues were given to the Maison royale de Saint-Louis.

Charles le Bouyer: 1691
Julien Raguideau: 1693
Pierre Arnould de Loo: 1696
Mathieu Gilbert: 1702
Charles Petey de l'Hostellerie: 1705
Pierre Arnould de Loo: 1708
Denys de Sainte Marthe: 1711
Robert Marchand: 1714
Denys de Sainte Marthe: 1717
François Anseaume: 1720
Pierre Richer: 1723
Pierre du Biez: 1729
Joseph Castel: 1736
Pierre du Biez: 1741 (par commission)
Joseph Avril: 1741
Pierre Boucher: 1748
Jacques Nicolas Chrestien: 1751  
Pierre Boucher: 1760
Jacques Nicolas Chrestien: 1763 (elected at Marmoutiers)
Joseph Delrue: 1766
René Gillot: 1767
Jacques Nicolas Chrestien: 1770
Pierre Français Boudier: 1773
André de Malaret: 1775
Pierre Bourdin: 1778
Pierre François Boudier: 1781
Pierre Bourdin: 1784  
André de Malaret: 1788  
François Verneuil: 1791

In 1792, the abbey was secularized amidst the French Revolution. In October 1793, the tombs of the abbey were desecrated. On 25 March 1809, the buildings were given to the Maison d'éducation de la Légion d'honneur.

Notes 

Lists of abbots
abbots of Saint-Denis